A spiral is an element in figure skating where the skater glides on one foot while raising the free leg above hip level. It is akin to the arabesque in ballet.

Spiral positions are classified according to the skating leg (left or right), edge (outside or inside), direction the skater is traveling (forward or backward), and the position of the free leg (backward, forward, sideways).

Spirals were a required element in ladies' singles and pair skating prior to the 2012–13 season. Spirals were infrequently performed by men at the Olympic level prior to the 2012–13 season because it was not a required element nor could men receive points for spiral sequences in the element score of the ISU Judging System.  In spite of this, some male skaters are known for their spirals, such as Toller Cranston, Paul Wylie, and Shawn Sawyer.

Edging and technique
The name "Spiral" is indicative of the skating edge. This move is generally (but not exclusively) demonstrated on a deep inside or outside edge. As the skater moves, he or she glides slightly to the left or right (depending on the edge used), and continues in a spiral pattern around the ice if held long enough.

Spirals can be performed on 8 edges: forward or backward, and on the inside or outside edges.  Straight line spirals aren’t typically done in shows or competition and are mostly only used for tests such as Pre-Preliminary MITF. 
The basic spiral is performed with the free leg stretched and extended to the rear above hip level. Many skaters try to lift the leg as high as possible, but more important than the height of the free leg is that it be fully stretched and that the tension of the position be maintained in the upper body as well.

Judges look at the depth, stability, and control of the skating edge, speed and ice coverage, extension, and other factors. Some skaters are able to change edges during a spiral. Michelle Kwan was known for her change-of-edge spiral, in which she maintained a fixed arabesque position while changing from an inside to outside edge.

Spiral sequence
A "spiral sequence" is a series of spiral moves performed together. The spiral sequence was a required element for ladies and pairs in international competition prior to the 2012–13 season; under the rules for the ISU Judging System, the skater must have held each spiral position for at least 3 seconds to have received credit for it.

A spiral sequence often included a change of edge spiral. The same spiral position was held, but the skater changed the edge he or she was skating on. The most common was forward inside edge to forward outside edge.

From the 2012–13 season and onward, the spiral sequence was replaced by the choreographic sequence. The choreographic sequence is required for men's, ladies' and pairs' free skating. The choreographic sequence consists of moves in the field, unlisted jumps, spinning movements, etc.

Variations
Spirals can also be performed in other positions, such as with the free leg extended forward or to the side, with a bent knee, or with the leg, knee, or skate supported with one or both hands. There are many variations and some names, while not necessarily official, have come into common use.

An arabesque spiral is the basic spiral position. The free leg is extended behind the body above hip height (at least a 90 degree angle). Some skaters are able to achieve vertical (180 degrees) with this position, but it is not required.

A catch-foot spiral does not refer to any single position, but generally refers to any spiral with the skate of the free leg being held in one or both hands. Catchfoot spirals include:

The Biellmann spiral is performed with the free leg grasped from behind and pulled overhead in the Biellmann position. This spiral may be performed on any of the spiral edges.

A cross-grab spiral is a catch-foot spiral with the skate of the free leg grasped from behind by the opposite hand (e.g. right skate held by the left hand, left skate held by the right hand)

A Y-spiral also known as a 180 because your legs are at a 180 degree angle is performed with the skate of the free leg held out to the side.  This is usually performed as a catch-foot spiral, although some skaters have increased the difficulty of this position by releasing the foot and holding the leg position unsupported.

A Charlotte spiral is a variation in which the torso is dropped down forward toward the skating leg and the free leg is lifted behind in a near-split position.

A Kerrigan spiral is a high-leg outside spiral performed with one hand supporting the knee of the free leg.  This position is named after Nancy Kerrigan.

A skid spiral (also known as a slide spiral) is a difficult 180-degree turn on the ice performed in a spiral position, using a skidden three turn to change directions. It was invented by Robin Cousins, and is notably performed by Sasha Cohen and Evgenia Medvedeva.

A fan spiral is a back outside edge spiral held with the free leg held unsupported to the skater's front or side.  Ideally, this position should be held with both legs straight, although less flexible skaters attempt to compensate for a lack of strength or flexibility by not fully extending the free leg or bending the skating leg.

An inverted spiral is a variation performed with the free leg held in front with the skater leaning backward over the edge of the skating foot so that the skater's upper body is held almost parallel to the ice.  The position attained in this spiral is similar to that of a layover camel.

Photo gallery

Single skating

Catch-foot spiral positions

Unassisted spiral positions

Pair skating

Synchronized skating

References

Figure skating elements